Nello Sforacchi (9 April 1922 – 6 October 2016) was an Italian racing cyclist. He rode in the 1948 Tour de France.

References

External links
 

1922 births
2016 deaths
Italian male cyclists
People from Scandiano
Cyclists from Emilia-Romagna
Sportspeople from the Province of Reggio Emilia